Lorena Martín (born 22 October 1996) is a Spanish runner who specializes in the 800 metres.

In the 800 metres at the 2022 World Athletics Indoor Championships, she qualified for the final by .002 seconds.  In the final, she finished 8th.  She qualified for these Championships as Spanish national champion.  This was her first major international championship.

References

External links

Living people
Spanish female middle-distance runners
1996 births
21st-century Spanish women